¿Cómo Te Llama? is the second solo album by Albert Hammond Jr. The album has 13 tracks and was released on July 7, 2008 in the UK and on July 8, 2008 in the US. "GfC" is the first single from the album, and it premiered on iLike on May 22, 2008.

On 27 May 2008, Hammond released "GfC" on iTunes in the US. The song had already been played extensively live on his 2007 tour, along with "In My Room". A non-album  B-side "& So it Goes" was released along with the single.

The title ¿Cómo Te Llama? is Spanish for "How does [he/she/it] call you?" rather than "What is your name?" (¿Cómo te llamas?).

Production

On August 29, 2007, Albert Hammond Jr. announced on his MySpace blog he was recording his second album. He recorded for five weeks in Electric Lady Studios in New York City with his band of Josh Lattanzi on bass (of Ben Kweller and The Lemonheads), and Matt Romano (The Strokes' drum technician) on drums. Marc Philippe Eskenazi (guitar, Medium Cool, The Mooney Suzuki), who toured with Hammond, played on the album according to an interview with Pitchfork Media. Steve Schlitz, from the band Longwave also plays on the album and Sean Lennon plays the piano on the song, "Spooky Couch". The album is produced by Hammond himself along with engineer Gus Oberg and drummer Matt Romano. String personnel are Earl Maneein (of Resolution15), Matt Szemela, Jon Weber and Jessie Reagen.

Track listing

Special Edition with Live DVD

 In My Room (Live)
 Everyone Gets A Star (Live)
 Bright Young Thing (LIve)
 Call An Ambulance (Live)
 In Transit (Live)
 Holiday (Live)
 Blue Skies (Live)
 101 (Live)
 Scared (Live)
 Hard To Live In The City (Live)
 Outro (Live)

recorded @ Bowery Ballroom || running time: 36 minutes

Chart performance

References

External links
Interview about the album
NME Article
http://www.alberthammondjr.com/gfcvideo/

2008 albums
Albert Hammond Jr. albums
Rough Trade Records albums
Albums recorded at Electric Lady Studios
2008 live albums
2008 video albums
Live video albums
Albert Hammond Jr. live albums
Albert Hammond Jr. video albums